Brave Blue is FLOW's twenty fourth single. Its A-Side was used as the second opening theme song for Eureka Seven: AO. The single has three editions: regular, limited, and anime. The limited edition includes a bonus DVD with extra footage including the song's music video. The anime edition has extra tracks. It reached #12 on the Oricon charts and charted for 7 weeks. *

Track listing

Anime Edition Track listing

Bonus DVD Track listing

References

2012 singles
2012 songs
Flow (band) songs
Ki/oon Music singles
Anime songs
Song articles with missing songwriters